Philip G. Kerpen is an American free-market policy analyst and political organizer. He is the president of American Commitment, a conservative 501(c)(4) organization which he founded in 2012. He previously served for over five years as the vice president of Americans for Prosperity.

Career

Policy analysis and debate
Kerpen began his career in 1999 as an intern at the Cato Institute, because he  “became disillusioned with insularity of academic debate” while attending the University of Pittsburgh.

Kerpen was a policy analyst for the Club for Growth. Until June 23, 2006, he was Policy Director for the Free Enterprise Fund, a United States free market advocacy group. Kerpen was the vice president of Americans for Prosperity for more than five years, ending his tenure there in April 2012. Kerpen is a syndicated columnist and a frequent radio and television commentator on economic growth issues. Kerpen is president of American Commitment, a conservative 501(c)(4) organization which he founded in 2012.

Works

In 2011, Kerpen wrote a book entitled Democracy Denied: How Obama is Ignoring You and Bypassing Congress to Radically Transform America – and How to Stop Him.

Personal
A native of Brooklyn, Kerpen attended Stuyvesant High School. He lives in Washington, D.C. with his wife Joanna and their four children. His brother is social media entrepreneur Dave Kerpen.

References

External links
 American Commitment
 National Review archive
 Fox News opinion archive
 

Living people
Policy debate
American activists
American columnists
People from Brooklyn
University of Pittsburgh alumni
Year of birth missing (living people)